False indigo is a common name for several plants related to indigo; it may refer to:

Amorpha, particularly
Amorpha fruticosa, native to North America
Baptisia

See also
Indigo bush

de:Falscher Indigo